Hardwick is a city in Rock County, Minnesota, United States. Hardwick was platted in 1892, and named after J. L. Hardwick, a railroad official. The city is known throughout the region for its immense stray cat population. As of 2018, stray cats outnumbered human residents of the city. A post office has been in operation at Hardwick since 1891. Hardwick was incorporated in 1898.

Geography

Demographics

2010 census
As of the census of 2010, there were 198 people, 87 households, and 52 families residing in the city. The racial makeup of the city was 98.0% White and 2.0% Native American. Hispanic or Latino of any race were 1.5% of the population.

There were 87 households, of which 24.1% had children under the age of 18 living with them, 43.7% were married couples living together, 11.5% had a female householder with no husband present, 4.6% had a male householder with no wife present, and 40.2% were non-families. 36.8% of all households were made up of individuals, and 19.5% had someone living alone who was 65 years of age or older. The average household size was 2.28 and the average family size was 2.92.

The median age in the city was 44 years. 23.7% of residents were under the age of 18; 10.7% were between the ages of 18 and 24; 18.1% were from 25 to 44; 27.3% were from 45 to 64; and 20.2% were 65 years of age or older. The gender makeup of the city was 44.4% male and 55.6% female.

2000 census
As of the census of 2000, there were 222 people, 96 households, and 62 families residing in the city. The racial makeup of the city was 97.75% White and 2.25% Native American. Hispanic or Latino of any race were 0.90% of the population.

There were 96 households, out of which 29.2% had children under the age of 18 living with them, 49.0% were married couples living together, 10.4% had a female householder with no husband present, and 35.4% were non-families. 32.3% of all households were made up of individuals, and 19.8% had someone living alone who was 65 years of age or older.  The average household size was 2.31 and the average family size was 2.92.

In the city, the population was spread out, with 27.5% under the age of 18, 4.5% from 18 to 24, 24.3% from 25 to 44, 23.4% from 45 to 64, and 20.3% who were 65 years of age or older.  The median age was 40 years. For every 100 females, there were 89.7 males.  For every 100 females age 18 and over, there were 91.7 males.

The median income for a household in the city was $29,583, and the median income for a family was $37,813. Males had a median income of $30,556 versus $23,750 for females. The per capita income for the city was $13,822.  About 8.3% of families and 12.8% of the population were below the poverty line, including 24.3% of those under the age of eighteen and none of those 65 or over.

Politics
Hardwick is located in Minnesota's 1st congressional district, represented by Mankato educator Jim Hagedorn, a Minnesota Republican. At the state level, Hardwick is located in Senate District 22, represented by Republican Doug Magnus, and in House District 22A, represented by Republican Joe Schomacker.

The City of Hardwick is represented by a council consisting of 4 elected members. Two seats are elected to two-year terms. The remaining two seats serve four-year terms. The mayor of Hardwick is elected to a two-year term.

References

External links
 Hardwick Minnesota Community Guide

Cities in Minnesota
Cities in Rock County, Minnesota